Louis Claude de Saint-Martin (18 January 1743 – 14 October 1803) was a French philosopher, known as le philosophe inconnu, the name under which his works were published; he was an influential of the mystic and human mind evolution and became the inspiration for the founding of the Martinist Order.

Léonce de Saint-Martin, composer and organist, was a distant relative of Louis-Claude de Saint-Martin.

Life
He was born at Amboise, into a family from the lesser nobility of central France.

As his father wished, he tried first law and then the army as a profession. While in the garrison at Bordeaux, he came under the influence of Martinez de Pasqually, usually called a Portuguese Jew (although later research has revealed the probability that he was a Spanish Catholic), who taught a species of mysticism drawn from cabbalistic sources, and endeavoured to found thereon a secret cult with magical or theurgical rites. Around September 1768 Saint-Martin was introduced to the Elect Coëns. From 1768 until 1771, Saint-Martin worked at Bordeaux as secretary to Martinez de Pasqually.

In 1771, Saint-Martin left the army to become a preacher of mysticism. Same year he was living with Jean-Baptiste Willermoz at Lyon, while writing his first book. His conversational powers made him welcome in Parisian salons; but his zeal led him to England, where he made the acquaintance of William Law, the English mystic, and to Italy and Switzerland, as well as to the chief towns of France. In February 1784, Saint-Martin joined Society of Harmony in Paris. In 1787, he met William Law on a trip to London. From 1788 until 1791 he resided at Strasbourg, where he met Baron Karl Göran Silfverhjelm, the nephew of Emanuel Swedenborg. At Strasbourg, in 1788, he met Charlotte de Boecklin, who introduced him to the writings of Jakob Böhme. In July 1790, he resigned from Rectified Scottish Rite and asked Jean-Baptiste Willermoz for his name to be removed from all Masonic registers. In 1792, Saint-Martin began corresponding with the Swiss theosopher Niklaus Anton Kirchberger von Liebisdorf.

A nobleman, he was interned and his property was confiscated during the French Revolution. He was later freed by local officials, who wanted him to become a school teacher. He was brought up a strict Catholic, and always remained attached to the Church, although his first work, Of Errors and Truth, was placed upon the Index. He died at Aulnay (now Châtenay-Malabry), from October 13 to October 14, 1803.

Works
He was the first to translate the writings of Jakob Böhme from German into French. His later years were devoted almost entirely to the composition of his chief works and to the translation of Böhme. His published letters show that he was interested in spiritualism, magnetic treatments, magical evocation and the works of Emanuel Swedenborg.

His chief works are Lettre à un ami, ou Considérations philosophiques et religieuses sur la révolution française (Letter to a Friend, or Philosophical and Religious Considerations on the French Revolution), Éclair sur l'Association humaine, L'Esprit des choses ou Coup d'œil philosophique sur la nature des êtres et sur l'objet de leur existence and Le Ministère de l'Homme-Esprit. Other treatises appeared in his Œuvres posthumes (1807). Saint-Martin regarded the French Revolution as a sermon in action, if not indeed a miniature of the last judgment. His ideal society was a natural and spiritual theocracy, in which God would raise up men of mark and endowment, who would regard themselves strictly as divine commissioners to guide the people. All ecclesiastical organization was to disappear, giving place to a purely spiritual Christianity, based on the assertion of a faculty superior to the reason moral sense, from which we derive knowledge of God. God exists as an eternal personality, and the creation is an overflowing of the divine love, which was unable to contain itself. The human soul, the human intellect or spirit, the spirit of the universe and the elements or matter, are the four stages of this divine emanation, man being the immediate reflection of God, and nature in turn a reflection of man. Man, however, has fallen from his high estate, and matter is one of the consequences of his fall. But divine love, united to humanity in Christ, will work the final regeneration.

Influence
Admirers of his works formed groups of Friends of St. Martin, which later became known as Martinists.

References

Attribution

External links
 Louis Claude de Saint-Martin
 Detailed biography (Eleazar Institute)
 “The Mystery of Truth: Louis-Claude de Saint-Martin’s Enlightened Mysticism,” Journal of the History of Ideas 61:4 (October 2000): 623-655

1743 births
1803 deaths
People from Amboise
18th-century Christian mystics
19th-century Christian mystics
Martinism
French philosophers
Roman Catholic mystics
French male non-fiction writers
18th-century occultists